Clavatula taxea, common name the yew turrid, is a species of sea snail, a marine gastropod mollusk in the family Clavatulidae.

Description
The size of an adult shell varies between 50 mm and 75 mm.  The color of the shell is yellowish brown, nexuously lineated with chestnut, under a thick olivaceous brown epidermis. The whorls are constricted above, slightly nodulously longitudinally plicate below, and flexuously longitudinally striate. The color of the aperture is brownish.

Distribution
This marine species occurs off False Bay to northeast of Cape of Good Hope, South Africa

References

 Kilburn, R.N. & Rippey, E. (1982) Sea Shells of Southern Africa. Macmillan South Africa, Johannesburg, xi + 249 pp. page(s): 116
 Kilburn, R.N. (1985). Turridae (Mollusca: Gastropoda) of southern Africa and Mozambique. Part 2. Subfamily Clavatulinae. Ann. Natal Mus. 26(2), 417–470

External links

 

Endemic fauna of South Africa
taxea
Gastropods described in 1798